Jhenaidah Government Veterinary College (JGVC) is the 9th veterinary institution in Bangladesh. It provides Doctor of veterinary medicine (DVM) degree of 5 years that includes a 4 year long academic and 1 year internship. It was established at 2010. Currently It is a Faculty of Jashore University of Science and Technology - JUST

History 

Dr. Liaquit Ali is the founder principal of the college. Jhenidah Govt Veterinary College, is an institution which administrated by the Department of Livestock Services (DLS) of Government of People Republic of Bangladesh and affiliated with Jessore University Of Science and Technology that is a specialised college where only the course of Doctor of Veterinary Medicine (that is a 5-year course) is being taught. JGVC is about  far from the main city of Jhenidah Zilla and situated on 10 acre land (100 acre occupied) beside the Jhenidah-Chuadanga main road.

Academic 

Every year, only 60 students able to get chance in the Jessore University of Science and Technology in DVM course after passing admission test.

Campus 

In JGVC, there are facilities such as halls for male and female students, mosque, auditorium, gymnasium, veterinary teaching hospital, medical center, rainwater plant for collecting rainwater safely, pond, playground, large-animal shed, lab-animal shed, guest house, medicinal garden, academic building, 14 laboratories, a modern 3rd generation central laboratory for biotechnological-genetical and vaccine thesis, and many other criteria.

References

Further reading
 
 

2010 establishments in Bangladesh
Educational institutions established in 2010
Veterinary schools in Bangladesh
Universities and colleges in Jhenaidah District